Coreopsis petrophila is a Mexican species of flowering plants in the family Asteraceae. It is native to the States of Jalisco, Durango, Nayarit, and Guerrero in western Mexico.

Coreopsis petrophila is a branching subshrub, growing largely on rocky slopes. Leaves are pinnately lobed with narrow lobes. Each major branch has a group of small yellow flower heads, each with both ray florets and disc florets.

References

External links
photo of herbarium specimen at Missouri Botanical Garden, collected in Jalisco in 1886, isotype of Coreopsis petrophila

petrophila
Plants described in 1887
Flora of Mexico